Emma Vallencey Freud  (born 25 January 1962) is an English broadcaster and cultural commentator.

Early life
Freud was born in London on 25 January 1962 and is the daughter of politician and broadcaster Sir Clement Freud (1924–2009) and June Flewett, known as the actress Jill Freud. She is the great-granddaughter of psychoanalyst Sigmund Freud. Her younger brother is Matthew Freud, and her uncle was the painter Lucian Freud. Her father's family were Jewish refugees.

Freud was educated in London at the all-female Queen's College school, attended Bristol University and Royal Holloway College.[3]

At 13, she performed at Queen's Theatre (now called Sondheim Theatre) in the West End as the daughter of Vincent Price in Anouilh's 'Ardele'. And at 17 she toured Europe with Mike Oldfield as a backing singer on his Tubular Bells tour.

At 24, she co directed at the Open Air Theatre Regent's Park, featuring Ralph Fiennes in his first role out of drama school.

Media career

Television
From 1986, Freud co-presented LWT's The Six O'Clock Show. In 1987, she earned a certain media notoriety for presenting a chat show, Pillow Talk, in which she interviewed guests whilst in bed with them, as part of LWT's late-night strand Night Network.

In 1990 and 1991, Freud presented two series of Plunder, a BBC2 chat show in which she interviewed guests including Spike Milligan, Harriet Harman and Joanna Lumley, and co-hosted the BAFTA Craft Awards with Kenneth Branagh. On Channel 4 Freud hosted two series of The Pulse, three series of The Media Show and presented the Turner Prize in 1992. For 3 seasons she fronted the arts show Theatreland for LWT. In 2014, she appeared on a celebrity edition of The Great British Bake Off for Comic Relief, and was declared star baker.

Radio
In 1988, she was one of the launch presenters of BBC Radio London's GLR, where she presented the weekday 10am - 12pm programme, produced by Chris Evans.

In 1993, Freud was invited by BBC Radio 1's new controller Matthew Bannister to reinvent the lunchtime programme. From January 1994, she appeared on a permanent basis every weekday between 12pm and 2pm, presenting a mix of music, interviews and interactive news features.

Since 1986, she has worked for BBC Radio 4 - as a regular co-host on the Saturday miscellany show Loose Ends, as well as hosting The X Factor, Midweek and One to One. In 2019 Freud interviewed author David Sedaris for BBC Radio 4 in a 3-hour feature looking back at his life's work.

Film 
Since 1992, Freud has worked with her partner, Richard Curtis, as either script editor or co-producer on all his titles. These include Four Weddings and a Funeral, Notting Hill, Bridget Jones's Diary, Love Actually, The Boat That Rocked (where she was also 2nd unit director), The Girl in the Café, Doctor Who (the Vincent Van Gogh episode), About Time, Trash, The Vicar of Dibley, and Yesterday.

Journalism 
Emma has written for The Telegraph, The Guardian and Radio Times. She currently has a column in Luxx Magazine for The Times. In 2016 Emma won "Columnist of the Year" award for her series of articles in the Telegraph on living in New York.

Since 2015 she has been a monthly columnist for BBC Good Food, writing about international food culture and interviewing chefs while she cooks one of their signature dishes. These include Yotam Ottolenghi, Rick Stein, Mary Berry, Stanley Tucci, Nigel Slater, Asma Khan, Michel Roux and Nigella Lawson.

Other work

Cultural work 
For 6 years Freud hosted the national and international broadcasts for National Theatre Live. Since 2009 she has chaired many Platform performances at the National Theatre - interviewing actors, writers and directors including Sir John Mortimer, Sir Nicholas Hytner and Bryan Cranston.  

She has chaired at festivals and live events, - including interviews with Al Pacino, Graham Norton, Mary Berry, Nadiya Hussain, Claudia Winkleman.   

She presents the 'Emma Freud Talks To...’ strand at the Cheltenham Literary Festival - including Sir David Attenborough, Bill Nighy, Helena Bonham Carter, Sir Lenny Henry, and Bono.

Charity and campaigning work 
Freud has worked for Comic Relief since 1992 - starting with stuffing envelopes, rising to Executive Producer of Red Nose Day.   Together with Richard Curtis, she has helped raise over 1.5bn for projects tackling poverty all over the UK and internationally.  

From 2004 to 2005, she was a co-creator of Make Poverty History and the Live 8 concerts.

She was awarded an OBE for services to the charitable sector in 2011.  She and Curtis have four children.

See also
 Freud family

References

External links

 Ms Emma Freud, OBE at Debretts
 

1962 births
Living people
Television personalities from London
English people of German-Jewish descent
English people of Austrian-Jewish descent
People educated at Queen's College, London
Alumni of Royal Holloway, University of London
Officers of the Order of the British Empire
English radio DJs
BBC Radio 1 presenters
English television presenters
Emma